Samuel S. Gnanamanickam (born July 18, 1945) is an Indian plant pathologist. He is known for his research on diversity of rice pathogens, molecular breeding of indica rices for disease resistance and for developing superior strains of beneficial strains of rhizosphere bacteria for biological control of rice diseases. He is a fellow of the National Academy of Agricultural Sciences and National Academy of Biological Sciences of India and was Chair of the biological control committee at the American Phytopathological Society. He was named by Marquis Who's Who as a noteworthy plant pathologist.

Early life and education 
Gnanamanickam was born in Kannanallur, Tamil Nadu, India, on July 18, 1945. He acquired a bachelor's and master's degree from Agricultural College and Research Institute Coimbatore, India, class 1969, and obtained his PhD degree in Plant Pathology from the University of Hawaiʻi in Honolulu, class 1976. He then earned a postdoctoral fellowship from Natural Sciences and Engineering Research Council of Canada, and worked for Agri-Food Canada.

Professional career 
Gnanamanickam has been associated with the University of Madras and was professor of plant pathology since 1998. He was also among the visiting scientists and a professor on a Biotechnology Career Fellowship visits to University of Hawaiʻi, Kansas State University, and University of Wisconsin. Since 2004, he has been recognized as an adjunct professor of plant pathology at the University of Arizona, Tucson.

Selected publications

Articles

Books 

 .

Honors
Gnanamanickam is the recipient of the Tamil Nadu Scientist Award.

References 

Scientists from Tamil Nadu
University of Hawaiʻi alumni
1945 births
Living people
Indian pathologists